Scotty's Junction is an unincorporated community in the Sarcobatus Flat of Nye County, Nevada where State Route 267 meets with U.S. Route 95 at an elevation of .

It was named after Walter E. Scott (a.k.a. Death Valley Scotty, of nearby Scotty's Castle fame).

Nevada Public Radio maintains translator station K201BF in the area, retransmitting KNPR in Las Vegas on 88.1 FM.

History
Scotty's Junction was originally a stop on the Bullfrog Goldfield Railroad (BGR) at Sarcobatus Flat/Tolicha for the Bonnie Claire Mines and the town of Bonnie Claire. The BGR was a short-lived railroad and it along with the Las Vegas and Tonopah Railroad (LV&T) were acquired by the Tonopah and Tidewater Railroad (T&T) and combined for the shortest route. Supplies to build Scotty's Castle were trucked from the Bonnie Claire Depot to the castle site. In fact, the last delivery this train would ever make would be construction supplies for Scotty's Castle, the tracks were literally torn up and scrapped after this last delivery and the ties taken to the castle to be used for firewood.

The Timbisha Shoshone Homeland Act of 2000 provides for transfer to the Timbisha tribe of 2800 acres (11 km³) of land and an annual  of ground water around Scotty's Junction.

References

External links

Unincorporated communities in Nye County, Nevada
Populated places in the Mojave Desert
History of the Mojave Desert region
History of Nye County, Nevada
Tonopah and Tidewater Railroad
Unincorporated communities in Nevada